The Ancient Ram Inn is a Grade II* listed building and a former pub located in Wotton-under-Edge, a market town within the Stroud district of Gloucestershire, England. The inn has been owned by many people since 1145 and was in the private ownership of John Humphries until his death in December 2017. This inn was said to have also been owned by the local St. Mary's Church when first built. The pub is reputed to be haunted.

History
The inn's original use was to house the masons and other builders employed to construct the neighbouring church. It was later - 1154 - taken up as the dwelling of the first recorded vicar; Gerinus. There are no later records of vicars or reverends living in the inn, so it is believed that the local town vicarage was built in the late 1100s. The inn has been visited by a range of groups interested in the paranormal, and has been the subject of similar tv coverage.

References

External links

Official website
Guardian Top ten haunted places in the UK

Grade II* listed buildings in Gloucestershire
Wotton-under-Edge
Reportedly haunted locations in South West England
Former pubs in Gloucestershire